Skovlunde station is a commuter railway station serving the suburb of Skovlunde west of Copenhagen, Denmark. It is located on the Frederikssund radial of Copenhagen's S-train network.

See also 
List of railway stations in Denmark

References 

S-train (Copenhagen) stations
Railway stations opened in 1882
1882 establishments in Denmark
Railway stations in Denmark opened in the 19th century